Nicolaas van der Waay (1855–1936) was a Dutch decorative artist, watercolorist and lithographer. He worked in many genres, including stamp, coin and banknote designs. He is perhaps best known for the allegorical illustrations he created for the Golden Coach and a series of paintings depicting the lives of girls from the Amsterdam Orphanage. His work was also part of the painting event in the art competition at the 1928 Summer Olympics.

Biography
His first drawing lessons came from Louis Koopman (1827-1877), whose daughter he would later marry. He then enrolled at the Rijksacademie, where he studied from 1871 to 1875. After graduating, he shared a workshop with one of his classmates, Jan Hillebrand Wijsmuller. In 1880, the Arti et Amicitiae society awarded him their first Willink van Collenprijs for his painting "Among Friends". He then moved into a larger studio with Ernst Witkamp, who had also been a student of Koopman's and, a few years later, was able to establish his own.

In 1883, he entered the competition for the Prix de Rome, but no prize was awarded that year due to an insufficient number of entries. Instead, August Allebé was able to obtain a ministerial grant that enabled him to make a study trip to Italy. On his return, he became a lecturer at the Rijksacademie; a position he held for thirty years. In 1891, he was named a Professor, succeeding Barend Wijnveld, who had retired, and remained in that position until his own retirement in 1927. Around 1900, he came under the influence of Isaac Israëls, adopting a freer brushstroke and more Impressionistic style.

He also did book illustrations, notably for The Enchanted Ravine, a work of juvenile fiction by Cora van Berckel-van Heek (1840-1920).

In 1922, he joined the "Maatschappij voor Kunst en Kunstverlangenden", a new organization founded by the painter . Its goal was to bring art to the "common people" at affordable prices. Among his best known students were Lizzy Ansingh, Tjeerd Bottema, Piet Mondriaan and Jan Sluijters.

Selected paintings

References

Further reading
 W.F. Loos, "Nicolaas van der Waay (1855-1936) en het Amsterdams genootschap M.A.B." (a secret society named after Michelangelo), in De Negentiende Eeuw, vol.13 (1989)
 I. Suidman, "Nicolaas van der Waay", in Kunstwerk, vol.4 #2 (1992)

External links

Arcadja Auctions: More works by Van der Waay.

1855 births
1936 deaths
19th-century Dutch painters
Dutch male painters
20th-century Dutch painters
Genre painters
Dutch watercolourists
Painters from Amsterdam
Dutch illustrators
Olympic competitors in art competitions
19th-century Dutch male artists
20th-century Dutch male artists